Life Album is Ikimono-gakari's second studio album. It was released in Japan on February 13, 2008.

Track listing

References

2008 albums
Ikimono-gakari albums